Tasco is an unincorporated community in Sheridan County, Kansas, United States.  It is located about 7 miles east of Hoxie and south of U.S. Route 24 highway, next to an abandoned railroad.

History
Originally named Guy was issued a post office in 1887. The post office was renamed Tasco in 1923, then discontinued in 1953.

Education
The community is served by Hoxie USD 412 public school district.

References

Further reading

External links
 Sheridan County maps: Current, Historic, KDOT

Former populated places in Sheridan County, Kansas
Former populated places in Kansas